Ponnumani  is a 1993 Indian Tamil-language drama film, directed by R. V. Udayakumar, starring Karthik, Soundarya (in her Tamil film debut) and Sivakumar. It was released on 16 April 1993.

Plot 

Ponnumani and Chinthamani are sweethearts who spend their childhood together in a village. Chinthamani goes off to pursue an education, but she and Ponnumani remain devoted to each other. Kathirvel, who dotes on Ponnumani wants to see them happily married.

It is decided that they would marry once Chinthamani's exams are over. Ponnumani, who has been waiting all his life for this moment sets off eagerly to receive Chinthamani at the station. He is shocked to find her in a mentally unbalanced state.

Later on he learns that Chinthamani has been brutally molested by Uday Prakash and is pregnant, which results in Kathirvel's death. Though overwhelmed with grief, he tries to arrange Chinthamani's marriage with the rapist. When the latter shows no remorse for his act, and tries to kill Chinthamani, Ponnumani kills him and is sentenced for 5 years. He is reunited with childlike Chinthamani and her daughter.

Cast 
 Karthik as Ponnumani
 Soundarya as Chinthamani
 Sivakumar as Kathirvelu
 Goundamani as Nachi
 Senthil
 Vadivelu
 Manorama as Kathiravelu's mother
 G. M. Sundar

Production 
Ponnumani is the Tamil debut for Soundarya. The film was entirely shot at Sethumadai near Pollachi.

Music 
The music was composed by Ilaiyaraaja. Lyrics were written by R. V. Udayakumar. The song "Adiye Vanjikodi" was composed by Karthik Raja. The song "Nenjukulle Innarunu" is set in Keeravani raga. According to Charulatha Mani, the song brought out "emotion of sadness in love very effectively". For the dubbed Telugu version Muddula Baava, all songs were written by Rajasri.

Release and reception 
Ponnumani was released on 16 April 1993. Malini Mannath of The Indian Express wrote, "The film is an average entertainer with Karthik getting enough scope to emote". K. Vijiyan of New Straits Times appreciated Karthik's performance and the music, but criticised the overuse of songs and the film's length. R. P. R. of Kalki praised Udayakumar's direction for making even little sequences poetic while also pointing out the flaws. Karthik won the Filmfare Award for Best Actor – Tamil.

References

External links 
 

1990s Tamil-language films
1993 films
Films about mental health
Films directed by R. V. Udayakumar
Films scored by Ilaiyaraaja
Indian drama films